The Baron of Menstrie (Baron of Menstry) was a title in the peerage of Scotland.

List of barons of Menstrie
Thomas MacAlexander
Alexander MacAlexander
Andrew MacAlexander 
Alexander Alexander
Sir William Alexander

References

Peerage of Scotland